Tonaroasty is an abandoned village and National Monument located in County Galway, Ireland.

Location

Tonaroasty is located 1.6 km (1 mile) east of Loughrea.

History and archaeology

References

Archaeological sites in County Galway
National Monuments in County Galway